Harold "Hal" Robert Steacy (June 7, 1923 – April 7, 2012) was a Canadian mineralogist who was the curator of the Canadian National Mineral Collection at the Geological Survey of Canada in Ottawa. The mineral steacyite is named for him.

References

Literature cited
Dunn, P.J., Fleischer, M., Burns, R.G. and Pabst, A. 1983. New mineral names. American Mineralogist 68:471–475.

Canadian mineralogists
Canadian curators
Geological Survey of Canada personnel
1923 births
2012 deaths